Camille Mathieu (4 October 1888 – 14 September 1933) was a French racing cyclist. He rode in the 1920 Tour de France.

References

1888 births
1933 deaths
French male cyclists
Place of birth missing